A beanpot is a deep, wide-bellied, short-necked vessel used to cook bean-based dishes. Beanpots are typically made of ceramic, though some are made of other materials, such as cast iron. The relatively narrow mouth of the beanpot minimizes evaporation and heat loss, while its deep, wide, thick-walled body facilitates long, slow cooking times.

Beanpots are commonly associated with New England, in particular Boston, Massachusetts. This association is evident in the nickname Beantown, and the use of the name beanpot for Boston events such as the Beanpot ice hockey tournament. 

Beanpots resemble the Indian handi and the Spanish, Mexican or Native American olla, and may be related to the latter vessel.

See also
 Baked beans
 Cassole
 Guernsey bean jar
 Handi
 List of cooking vessels
 Olla
 Slow cooker
 Tangia

References

External links
 Bean Pot Recipes Online
 American Centuries beanpot picture
 Borisov style bean pot picture
 Baked Beans: Exalted by New Englanders in 1800s
 Zuni Olla picture

Cooking vessels
Stews
Pot